Hendrik "Henk" de Best (1 May 1905, in Amsterdam – 6 July 1978, in Amsterdam) was a Dutch boxer who competed in the 1924 Summer Olympics. In 1924 he finished fourth in the heavyweight class after losing the bronze medal bout to Alfredo Porzio.

References

External links
Part 5 the boxing tournament

1905 births
1978 deaths
Heavyweight boxers
Olympic boxers of the Netherlands
Boxers at the 1924 Summer Olympics
Boxers from Amsterdam
Dutch male boxers